The Treason Act 1536 (28 Hen.8 c. 18) was an Act passed by the English Parliament during the reign of King Henry VIII of England. It made it high treason to marry or become engaged to the King's children, sisters, paternal aunts, or his nieces or nephews without the King's written permission, or "to deflower any of them being unmarried." It was also treason for any of the same relatives to participate in such treason.

The Act was repealed by the Treason Act 1547 in the first year of the reign of Henry's successor, Edward VI.

See also
High treason in the United Kingdom

References
Statutes at Large, vol. IV, Danby Pickering, Cambridge University Press, 1762, p. 447.

Treason in England
Acts of the Parliament of England (1485–1603)
1536 in law
1565 in England